Bilahari Kim Hee Papanasam Setlur Kausikan is a Singaporean retired academic, diplomat and civil servant who served as Singapore's Permanent Representative to the United Nations between 1995 and 1998.

Early life and education
Kausikan's father, P.S. Raman, a British Raj-born Tamil Brahmin who moved to Singapore after the Partition of India. He remarried to Lim Eng Neo, a Peranakan, they have three children. 

His father named him Bilahari Kim Hee Papanasam Setlur Kausikan. "Bilahari" is the name of a raga, "Kausikan", a form of the Vedic surname Kaushik, "Setlur", a Brahmin sub-caste, and "Papanasam", the name of his father's village in Tamil Nadu. "Kim Hee" was the Chinese name that Kausikan's mother gave him.

Kausikan graduated from the University of Singapore (now the National University of Singapore), majoring in political science. He subsequently received a scholarship from the Public Service Commission (PSC) to pursue a PhD in international relations at Columbia University, with the aim of becoming an academic. 

During this time, he would secretly submit articles to The Straits Times under the pseudonym "Bee Kim Hee". Half way into his dissertation, he decided to drop out from the course and return to Singapore, where he joined the Ministry of Foreign Affairs (MFA). He ultimately graduated with a Master of Arts degree from Columbia University.

Career
Kausikan joined the civil service in 1981 as a foreign service officer, and was assigned to the Administrative Service in 1983. 

His father gained Prime Minister Lee Kuan Yew's attention after he advised against editing out the video of Lee tearing while announcing Singapore's expulsion from the Malaysian Federation in 1965. Thereafter, he was appointed to various diplomatic positions, including Singapore's Ambassador to Indonesia during Konfrontasi, and subsequently as Singapore's High Commissioner to Australia and Ambassador to the Soviet Union. 

Recovering from a heart attack during his tenure in Jakarta, he was reassigned as Singapore's High Commissioner to Australia and served in that capacity for a year and a half.

Kausikan was appointed as Singapore's Ambassador to Russia in 1994, with concurrent accreditation as Ambassador to Finland. Kausikan served as Singapore's Permanent Representative to the United Nations between 1995 and 1998, with concurrent accreditation as Singapore's High Commissioner to Canada and Ambassador to Mexico. 

In 1998, Kausikan was appointed as Deputy Secretary (Foreign Affairs) at the Ministry of Foreign Affairs. He was appointed as Second Permanent Secretary in 2001, and was promoted to Permanent Secretary on 1 September 2010. 

He is currently serving as Chairman of the Middle East Institute at the National University of Singapore and is a Senior Fellow at the SMU School of Social Sciences.

Honours
 Pingat Pentadbiran Awam (Emas)  (Public Administration Medal (Gold)) 
 Pingat Jasa Gemilang (Meritorious Service Medal) 
 Order of Bernardo O'Higgins (Gran Cruz) by the President of Chile Ricardo Lagos, December 2002
 Oman Civil Merit Order (Second Class), by the Sultan of Oman Qaboos bin Said al Said, February 2013

References 

1954 births
Living people
Singaporean diplomats
Permanent secretaries of Singapore
Singaporean people of Tamil descent
Singaporean people of Indian descent
Singaporean people of Chinese descent
Recipients of the Pingat Pentadbiran Awam
Recipients of the Pingat Bakti Setia
Recipients of the Pingat Jasa Gemilang
Ambassadors of Singapore to Russia